Annona praetermissa (also called wild sour sop) is a species of plant in the Annonaceae family. It is endemic to Jamaica.  It is threatened by habitat loss.

Description
Its pollen is shed as permanent tetrads.

References

praetermissa
Vulnerable plants
Endemic flora of Jamaica
Taxonomy articles created by Polbot